Optical Race is the thirty-fifth major release and eighteenth studio album by Tangerine Dream. Optical Race is the inaugural album of the Melrose Years era, as it is the first appearance of the band on the Private Music label, founded by former Tangerine Dream member Peter Baumann. It was their first album without Christopher Franke since 1971's Alpha Centauri and the band's first to be programmed largely with a computer, an Atari ST using Steinberg/Jones software. The sleeve of the 12" release and the first release on CD and Compact Cassette features a die-cut outer sleeve with a multicolored inner sleeve.

"Atlas Eyes" is in  time. "Mothers of Rain" first appeared two years before the album's release, during the band's 1986 European tour. "Turning Off The Wheel" was re-released on the Transsiberia album in 1998 under the title "The Golden Horn". "Optical Race" was played by the group on German TV show Wetten, dass..? (moderated by Thomas Gottschalk) in 1988.

Track listing

Personnel
 Paul Haslinger – composer, musician
 Edgar Froese – composer, musician
 Ralf Wadephul – composer
 Christian Gstettner – studio technician
 Monica Froese – cover concept
 Norman Moore – art direction and design

References

1988 albums
Tangerine Dream albums